Gabriel Attal (born 16 March 1989) is a French politician of La République En Marche! (LREM) who has been serving as Minister of Public Action and Accounts in the government of Prime Minister Élisabeth Borne since 2022. He was the government spokesperson under President Emmanuel Macron from 2020 to 2022.

Early life and education 
Attal was born on 16 March 1989 in Clamart. He grew up in the 13th and 14th arrondissements of Paris with three sisters. His father was a lawyer and film producer and his mother worked as an employee of a film production company.

Attal studied at the École alsacienne. His political activity started when he participated in the 2006 youth protests in France. From 2007 to 2013, he studied at Sciences Po. In his first year he created the support committee for Íngrid Betancourt and coordinated support for the Franco-Colombian hostage held by the FARC. He graduated from Sciences Po in 2012 with a Master of Public Affairs, and studied law at Panthéon-Assas University. In 2009–2010, he went on a mission to Éric de Chassey, director of Villa Medici.

After an internship at the French National Assembly with Marisol Touraine during the presidential campaign, Gabriel Attal entered in 2012 the cabinet of the Minister of Health. Until 2017, he worked as an advisor in charge of relations with Parliament and as the Minister's speechwriter.

Political career

Member of the Municipal council of Vanves
In the 2014 municipal elections Attal was placed fifth on the Socialist Party list. He was elected as one of the four Socialist Party councilors of Vanves and took over the lead of the opposition, after the resignation of the head of socialist list.

Member of the National Assembly
Attal was elected to the French National Assembly on 18 June 2017, representing the Hauts-de-Seine's 10th constituency, winning out over the designated successor of André Santini.

Attal was quickly considered one of the most talented new members of parliament, with Amélie de Montchalin. As a député of the National Assembly he became a member of the Committee on Cultural and Education Affairs, where he served as whip of the group La République En Marche!.

In December 2017, Attal was appointed rapporteur on a bill on student orientation and student success.

Attal was named spokesperson of La République En Marche! in January 2018 and in September 2018, after the election of Richard Ferrand to the presidency of the National Assembly, he ran as a candidate to succeed him as president of the group La République En Marche!, but withdrew his candidacy the day before the election when he was considered one of the three favorites. He later endorsed Roland Lescure.

Member of the Government
On 16 October 2018, Attal was appointed Secrétaire d'Etat (Assistant Secretary) to the Minister of National Education and Youth, Jean-Michel Blanquer. At 29, he was the youngest member of a government under the Fifth Republic, beating the previous record set by François Baroin in 1995 by a few months. He was responsible for intervening on youth issues and setting up universal national service.

He was the government spokesperson under Prime Minister Jean Castex from 2020 to 2022.

He became Minister of Public Action and Accounts in the government of Prime Minister Élisabeth Borne in May 2022.

Personal life
Attal is openly gay and lives in a civil union with Stéphane Séjourné, a member of the European Parliament for La République En Marche!. He was outed on Twitter by his former class-mate Juan Branco in 2018.

See also
 2017 French legislative election
 Second Philippe government

References

1989 births
Living people
Deputies of the 15th National Assembly of the French Fifth Republic
Government ministers of France
La République En Marche! politicians
People from Clamart
Politicians from Île-de-France
Paris 2 Panthéon-Assas University alumni
Sciences Po alumni
LGBT legislators in France
Gay politicians
Members of the Borne government